The New Britain bronzewing (Henicophaps foersteri) is a species of bird in the family Columbidae. It is endemic to Papua New Guinea. In 1988, it was rated as a near threatened species on the International Union for Conservation of Nature Red List of Endangered Species. However, in 2000, it was warranted a vulnerable status.

Description 
The tail measures , and the bill measures  in length. It has a buff coloured forehead and a reddish brown crown. The irides and the bill are dark. It has dark brown upperparts, and the chin, throat, and ear feathers are creamy white. The greater and the median coverts are metallic golden green, and the lesser coverts are dark maroon. It has blue iridescent tertials.

It emits a monotonously repeating pip-yia call, with the second note being higher pitched than the first note.

Distribution and habitat 
The New Britain bronzewing is endemic to Papua New Guinea.

Status and conservation 
In 1988, the New Britain bronzewing was rated as a near threatened species on the IUCN Red List of Endangered Species. However, in 2000, it was warranted a vulnerable status due to its small population numbering less than 5,000, which is probably decreasing due to habitat loss. It is a rare species. It has been recorded in the Poikili and the Garu Wildlife Protection Areas.

References

External links

BirdLife Species Factsheet.

New Britain bronzewing
Birds of New Britain
New Britain bronzewing
Taxonomy articles created by Polbot